Lieselotte Templeton (née Kamm, 4 August 1918 in Breslau – 10 October 2009 in Berkeley, California) was a German-born American crystallographer. She received the Patterson Award of the American Crystallographic Association together with her husband David H. Templeton in 1987.

Life 
Templeton was the daughter of Berta Kamm (née Stern) and Walter Kamm, and the niece of Otto Stern. She grew up in Germany, fled to France in 1933 and emigrated to the US in 1936. She received her bachelor's degree and her PhD from University of California, Berkeley in 1946 and 1950, respectively. Glenn T. Seaborg was part of the committee for the qualifying examination of her PhD. Her PhD thesis, written under the supervision of Leo Brewer, was named: "The heats of formation of CN, N2 and NO". She was shortly associated with the Lawrence Berkeley National Laboratory and later worked as a research scientist for the University of California, Berkeley. In 1948, she married David H. Templeton and had two children with him. Due to anti-nepotism rules, she was sometimes not allowed to work in the same department as her husband.

Research 
After her PhD, she worked on solid-state chemistry, ceramics, and the detection of explosives. Her research in crystallography started with her work on the analytical absorption program (AGNOST), later called ABSOR. This program helped solving several crystal structures of heavy-element compounds and was also important for her studies on anomalous dispersion with synchrotron radiation on absorption edges which she performed jointly with David H. Templeton. This led to the development of the multi-wavelength anomalous diffraction phasing, now a standard method for protein structure analysis.

Together with David H. Templeton, she also used the polarized nature of synchrotron radiation to show X-ray dichroism in anisotropic molecules and to measure the polarized anomalous scattering in diffraction experiments for the first time.

Selected publications 
Three of her most important publications on anamalous dispersion of absorption edges with synchrotron radiation:

 

Two of her publications on X-ray dichroism in anisotropic molecules:

Awards 
She received the Patterson Award of the American Crystallographic Association jointly with her husband David H. Templeton in 1987 for their discoveries regarding use, measurement, and analysis of anomalous X-ray scattering.

Lieselotte Templeton Prize for Students 
The German Society for Crystallography (DGK) awards the Lieselotte Templeton Prize to students who have written an excellent Bachelor's or Master's thesis in the field of crystallography.

References 

2009 deaths
1918 births
American crystallographers
German emigrants to the United States